Jaspidella jaspidea is a species of sea snail, a marine gastropod mollusk in the family Bellolividae, the olives.

Description

Distribution
This species occurs in the Caribbean Sea, the Gulf of Mexico and the Lesser Antilles.

References

 Duclos P.L. (1844-1848). Oliva. In J.C. Chenu, Illustrations conchyliologiques ou description et figures de toutes les coquilles connues vivantes et fossiles, classées suivant le système de Lamarck modifié d'après les progrès de la science et comprenant les genres nouveaux et les espèces récemment découvertes.
 Chenu, 1844 Parts 29–30. In Illustrations Conchyliologiques ou description et figures de toutes les coquilles connues vivantes et fossiles, classées suivant le système de Lamarck modifié d'après les progrès de la science et comprenant les genres nouveaux et les espèces récemment découvertes, p. Oliva pp 5-12 ; Pecten pl 49, 18, 19, 17, 27, 33, 47, 48 ; Spondylus pl 27, 30 ; Strombus pl 20, 27
 Chenu, 1845 Parts 48. In Illustrations Conchyliologiques ou description et figures de toutes les coquilles connues vivantes et fossiles, classées suivant le système de Lamarck modifié d'après les progrès de la science et comprenant les genres nouveaux et les espèces récemment découvertes, p. Oliva pl 32, 25, 22, 24, 10, 5
 Paulmier G. (2015). Les Olivellidae (Neogastropoda) des Antilles françaises. Description de quatre nouvelles espèces. Xenophora Taxonomy. 8: 3-23.

External links
 MNHN? Paris: syntype
 Mörch, O. A. L. (1852-1853). Catalogus conchyliorum quae reliquit D. Alphonso d'Aguirra & Gadea Comes de Yoldi, Regis Daniae Cubiculariorum Princeps, Ordinis Dannebrogici in Prima Classe & Ordinis Caroli Tertii Eques. Fasc. 1, Cephalophora, 170 pp. [1852; Fasc. 2, Acephala, Annulata, Cirripedia, Echinodermata, 74 [+2] pp. [1853]. Hafniae]
 Rosenberg, G.; Moretzsohn, F.; García, E. F. (2009). Gastropoda (Mollusca) of the Gulf of Mexico, Pp. 579–699 in: Felder, D.L. and D.K. Camp (eds.), Gulf of Mexico–Origins, Waters, and Biota. Texas A&M Press, College Station, Texas

Bellolividae
Gastropods described in 1791